Unnodu Oru Naal is a 2013 Indian Tamil-language romantic thriller film directed by Durai Karthikeyan and starring Arjun Vijayraghavan, Gibran and Neelam. The film is inspired by the American film Unfaithful (2002). The Tamil film Ner Ethir (2014) has a similar storyline.

Premise 
The film is about two friends who fall in love with the same girl. 

Madhav falls in love with Priya, but Priya leaves Madhav and falls in love with Karthik. Madhav tries to forgot Priya and leave the country. Karthik marries Priya, but Karthik later turns showcases a different side of himself. What happens next forms the rest of the story.

Cast 
Arjun Vijayraghavan as Karthik
Gibran Osman as Madhav
Neelam as Priya

Production 
Director Durai Karthikeyan died in the middle of the film's shooting and his assistant Shakthi took over the direction.

Soundtrack 
The music is composed by Sivaprakasam. Lyrics by G. Malathi and Rudra. The music launch was attended by A. R. Reihana and Shantha Kumar.

"Angel Nee" - Haricharan, Krithika 
"Angel Nee" (remix) - Master Abishekh, Krithika 
 "Swasathil" - Chinmayi
"Dhoova Dhovaa" - Bhagyaraj, VJ Divya

Reception 
M. Suganth of The Times of India opined that "With a weak script and limp performances, Durai Karthikeyan’s debut film mostly resembles a student film that has managed to get screened on the big screen". On the contrary, Malini Mannath of The New Indian Express wrote that "Unnodu... is ideal fare for lovers of this genre".

References

External links 
 

2010s Tamil-language films